The Maikhanellidae are a family of Early Cambrian monoplacophora with a limpet-like morphology.

References

Cambrian molluscs
Cambrian first appearances
Cambrian extinctions
Monoplacophora